Krstajić is a Serbo-Croatian surname. Notable people with the surname include:

Danica Krstajić  (born 1987), former Montenegrin tennis player
Mladen Krstajić (born 1974), former Serbian footballer

Serbian surnames
Montenegrin surnames
Patronymic surnames